Georges Théophile Legagneux (24 December 1882 in Puteaux – 6 July 1914 in Saumur) was a French aviator, the first person to fly an aircraft in several countries, and the first to fly a fixed wing aircraft higher than 10,000 and 20,000 feet.

Biography

Legagneux flew his Voisin Farman I biplane in Vienna on 23 April 1909. This was the first ever fixed wing aircraft flight in Austria. His flight on 29 July 1909 in Stockholm also marked the first flight in Sweden. On 15 September 1909, Legagneux flew his aircraft from Khodynka Field, near Moscow. The five short flights he made were the first ever aircraft flights in Russia according to some sources, although other sources note a flight in Odessa (currently in Ukraine) on 25 July 1909 by a certain Van Der Schrouff. He flew again on the 19 September 1909, and then traveled to Odessa and Saint Petersburg for further demonstrations.

On 19 April 1910, he received French aviator license #55.

Legagneux participated in the Angers-Saumur race of 6 June, 1910. This was the first aircraft race between two cities, with seven competitors, and was watched by 200,000 spectators. Legagneux flew a Sommer 1910 biplane, and was one of only three contestants to take off. He finished second in 36 minutes 45 seconds, some 5 minutes behind winner Robert Martinet.

In August 1910, participating in the Circuit de l'Est on a Farman II biplane, he only managed to finish four of the six stages in the time limit, but he finished them all, achieving 3rd overall position (and the first on a biplane). At the Troyes stage, he was the only competitor to take to the air during the rest day, for the satisfaction of the public. At Charleville-Mézières, he was the first to take off for the 4th stage, which a violent wind seemed to make impossible, and there he accomplished a "fantastic journey": he landed five times along the way, including one for lunch with Julien Mamet (who unfortunately broke a wheel of his Blériot XI ), and Legagneux was only prevented from reaching Douai within the time limit due lack of fuel. In the last stage, he took time to land along the way to invite himself to lunch, and took a short tour above Puteaux to greet his hometown. 

On 9 December 1910, he broke the altitude record set by Ralph Johnstone on 27 October 1910. Johnstone had reached 8,471 feet, but starting from Pau Legagneux reached an altitude of 10,499 feet in his Blériot XI.

Legagneux reclaimed the world altitude record in December 1913, when he reached 20,079 feet (6,120 metres) in a Nieuport.

References

French aviation record holders
1882 births
1914 deaths
People from Puteaux
Chevaliers of the Légion d'honneur
Victims of aviation accidents or incidents in France
Aviation pioneers